"Friss oder stirb" (Feed or die) is a song by Die Toten Hosen. It was released as a non-album single in 2004. It is a socially critical song about the current situation in Germany.

An English version, titled "Dog Eat Dog", was recorded for the soundtrack of Land of Plenty.

"Goodbye Garageland", the b-side to this single, is a tribute to Joe Strummer, who died in 2002. Campino is a big fan of the Clash. The song contains quotes from classic Clash songs.

Music video
The music video was directed by Daniel Siegler.

The band performs in an abstract, animated, black, white, and red city, where a highway with cars and trucks, fields with combine harvesters, a jet airplane and a field with pumpjacks play a prominent role as symbols of economy.

Track listing
 "Friss oder stirb" (von Holst/Frege) - 3:44
 "Goodbye Garageland" (Frege, Ritchie, Matt Dangerfield) - 2:25
 "Lebt wohl & danke sehr" (Live well & thank you very much) - 2:17
 "Wir sind das Volk" (We are the people) - 1:29

2004 singles
Die Toten Hosen songs
Songs written by Campino (singer)
Songs written by Andreas von Holst
2004 songs